Raymond Chan  (born 1951) is a Canadian engineer and politician. He is among the first Chinese Canadian to be appointed to the Cabinet of Canada. A member of the Liberal Party of Canada, Chan was elected to Parliament in the 1993 federal election, defeating then Defence Minister Tom Siddon in the riding of Richmond, British Columbia. Chan is the fourth Chinese Canadian elected to Parliament, after Douglas Jung, who secured a seat in 1957, Art Lee in 1974 and Inky Mark in 1997. In 2008, Chan lost his riding of Richmond to Conservative candidate Alice Wong.

Early life
Raymond Chan was born in Hong Kong in 1951. He emigrated to Canada in 1969, two years after Canada liberalized its immigration policy. He received a B.A.Sc. degree in Engineering Physics from the University of British Columbia (UBC) in 1977. From 1977 to 1993, he worked as an engineer for TRIUMF, a particle accelerator laboratory at UBC.

Political career 
Chan joined the Liberal Party of Canada in 1991 after he was elected as the inaugural president of the Vancouver Alliance in Support of Patriotic Democratic Movement in China. Then he was elected to Parliament in the 1993 election, defeating Defence Minister Tom Siddon in the riding of Richmond, British Columbia. Chan secured the nomination win over future cabinet colleague Herb Dhaliwal, who subsequently chose to run in the adjacent Vancouver South riding. He was then appointed by Prime Minister Jean Chrétien as the Secretary of State for the Asia-Pacific Region for the Department of Foreign Affairs and International Trade. He served in this position from 1993 to 2000.

He was defeated in the 2000 election by Joe Peschisolido of the Canadian Alliance. After Peschisolido crossed the floor to the Liberal Party, Chan battled Peschisolido for the Liberal Party's nomination, and won it after a fiercely contested race.

Chan returned to Parliament in the 2004 election. He was subsequently appointed to the cabinet by Prime Minister Paul Martin as the Minister of State  (Multiculturalism) for the Department of Heritage.

Chan was re-elected in 2006, and served as Opposition Critic for the Asia Pacific, Seniors, the Social Economy, and Canada Border Security throughout the 39th session of Parliament.

He was defeated by Conservative Alice Wong in the election of 2008 by more than 8,000 votes. He sought nomination as a Richmond Liberal again in 2009 and was defeated by Peschisolido. He has been a major fundraiser for political candidates since leaving office.

Electoral history

References

External links 
 How'd They Vote?: Raymond Chan's voting history and quotes
 "Raymond Chan (Profile)" by Anthony Wilson-Smith and Chris Wood at The Canadian Encyclopedia

1951 births
Living people
Canadian engineers
Canadian Mennonites
Canadian politicians of Chinese descent
Canadian politicians of Hong Kong descent
Hong Kong emigrants to Canada
Liberal Party of Canada MPs
Members of the 26th Canadian Ministry
Members of the 27th Canadian Ministry
Members of the House of Commons of Canada from British Columbia
Members of the King's Privy Council for Canada
Naturalized citizens of Canada
People from Richmond, British Columbia
University of British Columbia alumni